Bōku is an abstract strategy board game played with marbles on a perforated hexagonal board with 80 spaces. The object of the game is to arrange five marbles in a row. The game has also been sold under the name Bollox, and later Bolix and won a Mensa Select award in 1999.

Invented by Rob Nelson, the former Portland Mavericks left-handed pitcher and creator of Big League Chew bubblegum. The idea for the game came to Nelson in 1991 when he was in London pitching for the Enfield Spartans. Along with good friend and owner of the Spartans Malcolm Needs they developed and marketed the game. Distributed by the London Games Company in Europe and Cadaco Toys in North America, for a time it enjoyed the position of being the best selling two player strategy games in both Harrods and Hamleys. The game was awarded a Mensa International Gold Star.

Rules
Bōku belongs to the class of connection games ("n-in-a-row" games) similar to Gomoku or Connect Four. It has two main rules:
 the game is won by putting five marbles into a row
 if a player traps two of his opponent's marbles between two of his own, he may remove one of the sandwiched marbles (and the opponent may not put a marble back into the same place with his next move).

World championships
The official Boku world championships have been held as part of the Mind Sports Olympiad since 2000 in England and David M. Pearce (England) has been the champion five times. Andres Kuusk (Estonia) has won the title four times. The 2005 Bōku World Champion was Joey Ho from London, who was aged 17 when he claimed the title after defeating reigning champion David Pearce.

List of World Champions

 2000:  David Glaude (Belgium)
 2001:  Jan Palmgren (Sweden)
 2002:  Ben Pridmore (England)
 2003:  David M. Pearce (England)
 2004:  David M. Pearce (England)
 2005:  Joey Ho (Hong Kong)
 2006:  David M. Pearce (England)
 2007:  James Heppell (England)
 2008:  David M. Pearce (England)
 2010:  David M. Pearce (England)
 2011:  Andres Kuusk (Estonia)
 2012:  Andres Kuusk (Estonia)
 2013:  Andres Kuusk (Estonia)
 2014:  Andres Kuusk (Estonia)
 2015:  Martin Hobemagi (Estonia)
 2016:  Alain Dekker (South Africa)

See also
List of world championships in mind sports

References

External links
 MSO Boku page
 The Game of Bōku
 

Board games introduced in 1999
Abstract strategy games
Mensa Select winners
In-a-row games